Sarıyaprak is a village in the Besni District, Adıyaman Province, Turkey. The village is populated by Kurds of the Hevêdan tribe and had a population of 676 in 2021. Before the 2013 reorganisation, it was a town (belde).

References

Villages in Besni District

Kurdish settlements in Adıyaman Province